Frank Henry Kring (October 21, 1918 – November 26, 1962) was an American football player. 

A native of Lometa, Texas, Kring attended R. L. Paschal High School in Fort Worth, Texas. He played college football as a fullback for TCU from 1938 to 1941. He also served in the United States Coast Guard. 

He played professional football in the National Football League (NFL) as a linebacker for the Detroit Lions. He appeared in five NFL games, one or two as a starter, during the 1945 season.

King later worked as a teacher and coach in the Lake Worth, Texas, public schools. He eventually became assistant principal at Lake Worth High School. He died in 1962 at age 44.

References

1918 births
1962 deaths
American football linebackers
TCU Horned Frogs football players
Detroit Lions players
Players of American football from Texas